is a 1969 Japanese jidaigeki film.

The true story of the end of the Shogunate, the tragedy of the Shinsengumi is one of the best loved stories of Japanese history and has been adapted many times on stage, screen, television, and anime. This film, starring Toshiro Mifune with an all-star cast, stands out as one of the definitive adaptations of this classic tale.

Plot
Near the end of the nineteenth century, as the balance of power shifts from Shogunate towards the Emperor, Japan restlessly awaits the dawning of a new age. But not all are content.

The Shinsengumi, a small army of samurai, farmers and peasants, band together to do battle against the tide of history. Their leader, Isami Kondo (Mifune), is a man who rises from farmer to fighter to head the fierce Shinsengumi brigade. Using a stern hand and a heart of gold, he rallies his men in defense of the tottering Shogunate. But bloodshed and treachery lurk around every corner.

Cast
Toshiro Mifune as Isami Kondo
Keiju Kobayashi as Toshizo Hijikata
Kinya Kitaoji as Soji Okita
Rentarō Mikuni as Kamo Serizawa
Yoko Tsukasa as Tsune
Yumiko Nogawa
Ichirō Nakatani
Ryōhei Uchida as Niimi Nishiki
Katsuo Nakamura
Takahiro Tamura as Koshitaro Ito
Nakamura Kinnosuke

References

External links 
 
 

1969 films
1960s historical action films
Japanese action films
Japanese historical action films
1960s Japanese-language films
Jidaigeki films
Samurai films
Films set in Bakumatsu　
Films set in Kyoto
Historical action films
1960s Japanese films